Anuj Gurwara (born 9 June 1981) is an Indian playback singer, master of ceremonies, actor, voice artist, radio jockey and television show host, who has won a Filmfare Award for his singing in the film Magadheera (2009).

Early life
Anuj comes from a family of educators. His father, Yogendra Gurwara, and mother, Jyoti Gurwara, are educationists and run a school, Sherwood Public School, Hyderabad.

Anuj did his schooling in Sherwood and later, graduated in Psychology and Advertising from Nizam College, Hyderabad. He was an active part of Arts and Music in school and college.

Career
Anuj started his career working as a copywriter and content developer for various design firms and advertising agencies. After a short stint with a theatre group, he decided to pursue a career in entertainment.

Singer
In 2009 Anuj debuted as playback singer for Tollywood, not knowing how to speak Telugu. Under the direction of M. M. Keeravani, he sang a song, "Panchadara Bomma", for the Telugu film, Magadheera, one of the highest-grossing Telugu films ever. Along with the success of the film, the song, Panchadara Bomma, grew to be a massive hit and established Anuj as a fresh new voice in the world of music.

S. S. Rajamouli, the director of Magadheera, stated in an article - "I opine that Panchadara Bomma is the best song in my career". The song was also declared Top Telugu Song of the year 2009 by various media channels, including newspapers, FM radios and television channels, winning awards across various platforms.

The song "Panchadara Bomma" is said to have singularly generated revenues of over Rs 30 million from mobile phone ringtone downloads, which is said to be a record that no other song in Telugu cinema has yet matched.

Panchadara Bomma also earned Anuj his first ever Filmfare trophy. He was awarded Best Male Playback Singer in a star-studded ceremony in Chennai on 7 August 2010.
Anuj's Hindi singing debut happened in 2012, in the form of Makkhi, the dubbed version of the superhit Telugu film, Eega. Apart from singing two songs in then film, he also penned the lyrics for two songs.

In 2019, Anuj released his first ever independent single - Amma Bawa - India's first ever Hyderabadi (Deccani/Dakhni) Pop Song. Composed by Sanket Sane, Anuj wrote and sang the song and released it on Times Music YouTube channel. The song went on to cross the 2 million views mark on YouTube within 9 days of its release, becoming a runaway hit.

Live Performances
Anuj has been actively performing in India and abroad at various corporate shows and public gigs after his award-winning singing debut.

He has performed across the United States of America to packed audiences. Invited by the Indian associations in various cities, he has set benchmarks with his energetic and fun performances in New York, New Jersey, Washington DC, San Francisco, Sacramento, Phoenix, Detroit, Dallas, San Antonio, Columbus, Philadelphia, Chicago, Bloomington, etc.

Anuj has also performed in Singapore, Malaysia, Mauritius, Kuwait, Istanbul, France, Hong Kong and other countries.

Master of Ceremonies
Being an RJ and an actor, Anuj diversified himself as an MC. From hosting formal events to large parties and concerts, Anuj has established himself as one of the most popular Master of Ceremonies. He has hosted events, big and small, for a large number of corporate companies and Event Managers.

Anuj's understanding of the pulse of an event, appropriate sense of humor, smooth integration of various elements, personalised involvement with the crowd and respect to the theme of the event, has made him a preferred MC for various kinds of events.

Actor - Film and Theatre
In 2003, while pursuing acting, Anuj got a call from Nagesh Kukunoor for Hyderabad Blues 2. After this, Anuj auditioned for Sekhar Kammula. Sekhar had won the National Film Award for his directorial debut in Dollar Dreams. He cast Anuj as the 2nd lead for his film Anand, which released in 2004. Anand was a massive hit and Anuj received good reviews for his part.

Anuj made a comeback into cinema after establishing himself as a playback singer. He played a cameo in S. S. Rajamouli's hit film of 2010 Maryada Ramanna

He has been an active theatre actor in Hyderabad since 1999, as part of various Theatre productions. He has showcased his talent as an actor and received positive reviews for his performance.

Anuj's theatre production - The Open Couple, which he acted in and co-produced as well, earned nominations in five categories at the prestigious Mahindra Excellence in Theatre Awards 2014, including a Best Actor nomination for him. After performing across the country, the play was also invited to be a part of the National Centre for the Performing Arts' Cheer! Comedy festival, where they performed to a sold-out audience.

He went on to play 3 important characters in Lillete Dubey's acclaimed play - Gauhar, performing on some of the most prestigious stages across India, including Prithvi Theatre, NCPA, Siri Fort Auditorium, Tagore Theatre and many more.

Anuj is also part of cast of The Big Fat City, a cine-play written and directed by Mahesh Dattani for Netflix India. He has also played a part in Kartik Aaryan's next film Dhamaka (2021 film), directed by Ram Madhvani.

Radio
In 2005, Anuj auditioned for All India Radio. He was selected and started hosting music-based shows on Yuvavani. Following All India Radio, Anuj worked for Radio Biryani, a private radio program setup that aired on the AIR frequency. That year, Anuj was awarded Best RJ (Hindi) for his show, Naach Meri Jaan. Anuj's joined Radio City 91.1 FM in 2006. The station was setting up in Hyderabad, one of the first private FM stations in the city.

Anuj began hosting an evening drive time show, Recharge, six days a week, from 8:00 pm to 11:00 pm. He played popular Hindi music and maintained high energy, wit and humor throughout the three hours. The show was a hit right in its early days. It struck a chord with the evening listenership that would drive back from work, and as Anuj would say, "recharge" their batteries on their way home. Anuj enjoyed immense popularity through the show. The name stuck with him and he is fondly called RJ "Recharge" Anuj to this day. Anuj shifted to the 5:00–9:00 pm time slot after a year, yet, commanded a dedicated listenership in Hyderabad.

Owing to his personal connect and popularity with listeners, he was awarded "No.1 RJ across All-India Radio City" for the year 2006–07. Anuj was soon shifted to the morning show, The Radio City Breakfast Show, from 7:00 am to 11:00 am, where he, with Shraddha, gave a fun and energetic start to the day. The chirpy, positive and friendly banter between them had Hyderabad tuned in every morning. In February 2008, Anuj was awarded "India's Best Radio Host for 2007-08" in a nationwide search.

Anuj quit Radio City in July 2008, after the station changed its language mix to a more regional sound.

Podcast 
In 2021, Anuj published his own podcast - EdTalk with Anuj! A talk-show series focused on conversations around the Education system in India.

Television (VJ)
In February 2006, Anuj became a VJ with SS Music. He won the VJ Factor 2, a hunt for VJs in South India. Out of about 5000 people who competed, Anuj was one of the four winners. It was a short-lived role as Anuj got an opportunity in Radio City, Hyderabad soon after.

Travel show host
Anuj hosted a travel-based television show called Road To Paradise, on Travel Trendz TV, in 2011. The show, in English and Hindi, was based on an adventure-exploration theme, where Anuj rode a bike across India, followed by two cameras, exploring hidden locales, tourist spots, music, dance, food and culture.

Voice work and writing
Anuj Gurwara is a freelance voice-over artist and script writer for various ad films, radio spots, documentaries, films, training modules and e-learning projects. In 2009, Gurwara became part of India's first ever PlayStation 2 game, Hanuman, as the voice of Hanuman in Hindi and English. He also regularly dubs for characters in films.

As writer and dubbing incharge, one of Gurwara's major projects was the entire language conversion of the Telugu film Eega into its Hindi version, Makkhi. Anuj was responsible for writing the Hindi version of the film, casting voice actors as well as directing the entire dub of the film, apart from dubbing for the main lead, played by Nani. Anuj also sang two songs, while debuting as lyricist for two songs.

Makkhi was a highly successful film, and Anuj received praise and reviews for its high-quality dubbing.

Anuj is the official Hindi voice of the Marvel Superhero Falcon. He has dubbed for Falcon's voice in all of Marvel superhero films where the character appears.

He occasionally writes columns for newspapers as well.

Discography (Singer)

Discography (Lyricist)

Filmography (Actor)

Films & Television

Filmography (Dialogue Writer)

Theatrical Productions (Actor)

Dubbing career
He is known for dubbing for Anthony Mackie as Sam Wilson / Falcon in Marvel Cinematic Universe films in Hindi.

Dubbing roles

Live action television series

Live action films

Radio Shows

Awards

Playback singing
 57th Filmfare Awards South - Best Male Playback Singer (Telugu) for "Panchadara Bomma" (Magadheera; 2009) 
 MAA TV's CineMAA Awards - Best Male Playback Singer for "Panchadara Bomma" (Magadheera; 2009)
 South Scope Best Male Playback Singer Award for "Panchadara Bomma" (Magadheera; 2009)
 Mirchi Music Awards South 2010 - Listener's Choice Best Song of the Year for "Panchadara Bomma" (Magadheera; 2009)
 Mirchi Music Awards South 2010 - Best Playback Singer (Nominated) for "Panchadara Bomma" (Magadheera; 2009)
 Radio City 91.1 FM - Best Playback Singer (Male) for "Panchadara Bomma" (Magadheera; 2009)
 Radio City 91.1 FM - Best Song of the Year for "Panchadara Bomma" (Magadheera; 2009)
 Big 92.7 FM Ugadi Music Awards 2010 - Best Upcoming Singer of the Year for "Panchadara Bomma" (Magadheera; 2009)
 Big 92.7 FM Ugadi Music Awards 2010 - Best Love Song of the Year for "Panchadara Bomma" (Magadheera; 2009)
 Aalapana Music Awards 2010 - Best Upcoming Playback Singer for "Panchadara Bomma" (Magadheera; 2009)

Recognition
 Listed in Top 50 Achievers of South India for 2009-10 by Avant Garde Magazine Hyderabad (Nov 2010)
 Youth Achiever Award by The Passionate Foundation
"Jade of Hyderabad" for exemplary services to the event industry, by Telangana Chamber of Events Industry

Radio jockey
 2005 - Best RJ (Hindi) - Radio Lovers Association of Hyderabad - Radio Biryani
 2007 - Best RJ (Male) - All India Radio City stations - Radio City 91.1fm - Radio City 91.1fm
 2008 - India's Best Radio Host - Radio Duniya Magazine - Radio City 91.1fm

See also
Dubbing (filmmaking)
List of Indian Dubbing Artists

References

1981 births
Living people
Male actors in Telugu cinema
Indian male film actors
Indian male playback singers
Indian radio presenters
Performers of Hindu music
Singers from Hyderabad, India
Telugu playback singers
Filmfare Awards South winners
Masters of ceremonies
Male actors from Hyderabad, India